Salmeron or Salmerón is a surname, and may refer to:

 Alfonso Salmerón (1515–1585), Jesuit Bible scholar
 Cristobal Garcia Salmeron (1603–1666), Spanish painter
 Francisco Salmerón  (1608–1632)
 Juan de Salmerón,  16th-century Spanish colonial official
 Luis Salmerón, Argentine football player
 Nicolás Salmerón y Alonso  (1838–1908), Spanish statesman
 Roberto Salmeron, Brazilian scientist

See also
 Salmerón, province of Guadalajara, Spain